Ciarán Power (born 8 May 1976 in Waterford, Ireland) is a former professional racing cyclist, the first Irish cyclist to ride in a major tour since Stephen Roche in 1993.  He is a member of the Irish Pezula Racing Team.  Power turned professional in 2000 with Linda McCartney Racing Team and rode the 2000 Giro d'Italia, gaining 2 top ten stage finishes.  When the McCartney team folded in 2001, Power joined the French St Quentin team before moving to the US the following season and joining Navigators.

After placing 3rd in the 1999 World 'B' road championship, Power came 74th in the 2000 Summer Olympics road race.  In the 2004 Summer Olympics road race, he finished 13th, the highest placing by an Irish cyclist.

He retired from professional racing at the end of the 2008 season.

Major Results

2008 – Pezula Racing
1st, East Midlands International Cicle Classic (2.1)
1st, Rás Mumhan
3 Stage wins
Points winner
7th, Irish National Road Race Championship (CN)
8th, Ronde van Overijssel (1.2)
10th, Philadelphia International Championship (1.HC)
12th, Reading Classic (1.HC)
18th, Commerce Bank Triple Crown (1.HC)
37th, Tour of Ireland (2.1)
7th, Stage 3
8th, Stage 2
19th, Stage 1
37th, FBD Insurance Rás (2.2)
1st, Stage 6
Points: 2nd
41st, Lehigh Valley Classic (1.HC)
51st, Tour de Beauce (2.2)
2nd, Stage 2
4th, Stage 6
77th, Tour of Qinghai Lake (2.HC)
8th, Stage 10
10th, Stage 7

2007 – Navigators Insurance Cycling Team
1st,  Irish National Criterium Championship (CN)
4th, Rund um Köln (1.HC)
xxth, FBD Insurance Rás (2.2)
1st, Stage 4
1st, Stage 7

2006 – Navigators Insurance Cycling Team
1st, Mengoni Cup (USA)
xx, FBD Insurance Rás (2.2)
1st, Stage 4
1st, Stage 7
Mountains class: 1st
2nd, Irish National Road Race Championship (CN)

2004 – Navigators Insurance Cycling Team
1st, Stage 5a, GP Cycliste de Beauce (2.3)
5th, Wachovia Invitational (1.3)
6th, Irish National Road Race Championship (CN)
13th, 2004 Olympics Road Race (Athens)

2003 – Navigators Insurance Cycling Team
1st, Stage 3, FBD Milk Rás (2.5)
1st, Stage 7, FBD Milk Rás (2.5)
1st, Stage 3, Nature Valley Grand Prix
6th, Irish National Road Race Championship (CN)

2002 – Navigators Insurance Cycling Team
1st overall, FBD Milk Rás (2.5)
2nd, Irish National Road Race Championship (CN)
3rd, Stage 3, GP Cycliste de Beauce (2.3)
4th, First Union Classic (1.3)
4th, Grand Prix de la Ville de Rennes (1.3)

2001 – St. Quentin-Oktos team
3rd, Irish National Criterium Championship (CN)
7th,  Irish National Road Race Championship (CN)

2000 – Linda McCartney Cycling Team
9th overall, Herald Sun Tour (2.4)
2nd, Stage 12
10 top 10 stage finishes
23rd overall, Tour of Langkawi
74th, Olympics Road Race
122nd overall, Giro d'Italia (Grand Tour)
5th, Stage 3
6th, Stage 16
13th, Stage 21
18th, Stage 10
Points class: 42nd
First Grand Tour completed

1999 – Comeragh CC (amateur)
6th overall, Tour of Egypt (part of Irish team)
1st, Stage 7
2nd, Stage 3
10th, Prologue (ITT)
7th overall, Tour of Rhodes (part of Irish team)
6th, Stage 2
10th, Stage 4
8th, Irish National Road Race Championship (CN)

1998 – (amateur)
1st overall, FBD Milk Rás
1st,  Irish National Under 23 Road Race Champion (CN)

External links
Power bio @ Navigators official site

Sportspeople from County Waterford
Irish male cyclists
Olympic cyclists of Ireland
Cyclists at the 2000 Summer Olympics
Cyclists at the 2004 Summer Olympics
Living people
1976 births
Rás Tailteann winners